Henry Fred Hines (September 29, 1867 in Elgin, Illinois – January 2, 1928 in Rockford, Illinois), was a former professional baseball player who played outfield in two games for the Brooklyn Grooms during the 1895 baseball season.

External links

1867 births
1928 deaths
Major League Baseball outfielders
Baseball players from Illinois
19th-century baseball players
Brooklyn Grooms players
Sportspeople from Elgin, Illinois
Sportspeople from Rockford, Illinois
Milwaukee Cream Citys players
St. Louis Whites players
Burlington Hawkeyes players
Oakland Colonels players
Minneapolis Minnies players
Kansas City Blues (baseball) players
Detroit Tigers (Western League) players
Buffalo Bisons (minor league) players
Rockford Rough Riders players
Des Moines Hawkeyes players
Rockford Red Sox players
Davenport River Rats players
Dubuque Shamrocks players
Baton Rouge Cajuns players
Minor league baseball managers
Sportspeople from the Chicago metropolitan area
Sterling (minor league baseball) players